The women's team competition of the 2011 World Judo Championships was held on August 28 at Palais Omnisports de Paris-Bercy in Paris. Each team consists of five competitors, one each from the –52, –57, –63, –70 and +70 kg categories.

Medalists

Results

Repechage

References

 Draw

External links
 

Wteam
World Women's Team Judo Championships
World 2011
World Wteam